John Cartledge (born 27 November 1984) is an English semi-professional footballer who plays for Isthmian League Premier Division side Sutton United.

Career

Bury
Cartledge came through the youth ranks from Birmingham City before arriving at Gigg Lane. He started seven games for Bury in his debut season in 2003–04, scoring one goal. In 2004-05 Cartledge was limited to one starting appearance and four as substitute. He was released by Bury in November 2005.

Carshalton Athletic
Cartledge was signed up on a free transfer by Carshalton Athletic in the Conference South in November 2005. He went on to make 25 league appearances in the 2005–06 season for The Robins, and was voted Player of the Year. Carshalton were relegated to the Isthmian League for 2006-07 and Cartledge appeared in 37 league games. The following season, he featured in six games, scoring once, but injury problems plagued his season and he was released by Robins manager Hayden Bird in January 2008.

Whyteleafe & Leatherhead
He signed for Isthmian League Division One side Whyteleafe in January 2008. Cartledge played out the 2007–08 season with The Leafe before joining local Surrey rivals  Leatherhead. He was the captain for the Mole Valley outfit in the 2008–09 season, however he left The Tanners in the summer of 2009, joining Isthmian League Premier Division side Sutton United.

Sutton United
Cartledge played the autumn in the Sutton reserves, who are in the Suburban Football League. In January, he made his first-team debut in the league win over Tonbridge Angels. Cartledge was loaned to Metropolitan Police in the spring of 2010, and recalled to United for the Surrey Senior Cup quarter-final away at Croydon Athletic in April. He was injured in the first half of the game.

References

External links

1984 births
Living people
Footballers from Carshalton
English footballers
Association football defenders
Birmingham City F.C. players
Bury F.C. players
Carshalton Athletic F.C. players
Whyteleafe F.C. players
Leatherhead F.C. players
Sutton United F.C. players
Metropolitan Police F.C. players
English Football League players
National League (English football) players
Isthmian League players